, , or  (the phrase in Portuguese means literally 'turn of the sea' but also 'return from the sea') is a navigational technique perfected by Portuguese navigators during the Age of Discovery in the late fifteenth century, using the dependable phenomenon of the great permanent wind circle, the North Atlantic Gyre. This was a major step in the history of navigation, when an understanding of winds in the age of sail was crucial to success: the European sea empires would not have been established without an understanding of the trade winds.

History

Portuguese discovery in the Atlantic Ocean
The  was a sailing technique discovered in successfully returning from the Atlantic islands, where the pilot first had to sail far to the west in order to catch usable following winds, and return to Europe. This was a counter-intuitive sailing direction, as it required the pilot to steer in a direction that was perpendicular to the ports of Portugal.

Similarly in the South Atlantic with the exception that the South Atlantic gyre circulates counterclockwise.  As India-bound Portuguese explorers and traders crossed the equator with the intention of passing the entire western coast of Africa, their voyages took them far to the West (in the vicinity of Brazil.)

Application to the Pacific Ocean – the Manila Galleon

The route of the Manila Galleon from Manila to Acapulco depended upon successful application of the Atlantic phenomenon to the Pacific ocean: in discovering the North Pacific Gyre, captains of returning galleons had to reach the latitudes of Japan before they could safely cross. The discovery, upon which the Manila-Acapulco galleon trade was based, is owed to the Spanish Andrés de Urdaneta, who, sailing in convoy under Miguel López de Legazpi, discovered the return route  in 1565: the fleet split up, some heading south, but Urdaneta reasoned that the trade winds of the Pacific might move in a gyre as the Atlantic winds did. Though he sailed to 38 degrees North before turning east, his hunch paid off, and he hit the coast near Santa Catalina Island, California, then followed the coast south to Acapulco. Most of the crew was suffering from scurvy and only 18 remained strong enough to sail the ship.

Notes

References

Portuguese 
 
 

Portuguese exploration in the Age of Discovery
Age of Sail
History of the Atlantic Ocean
History of the Pacific Ocean
Maritime history of Portugal
Navigation
Portuguese language